The Tenaska Imperial Solar Energy Center West is a 150 megawatt (MW) photovoltaic power plant built in Imperial County, California. Construction began in 2014 and full commercial operation was achieved in September 2016.  Power is sold to San Diego Gas & Electric on a 25-year agreement.

The plant is owned by CSOLAR IV South, LLC, an affiliate of Tenaska.

Electricity production

See also

 Solar power in California
 List of photovoltaic power stations

References

Buildings and structures in Imperial County, California
Solar power stations in California
Photovoltaic power stations in the United States